Electronic News Production System (ENPS) is a software application developed by the Associated Press's Broadcast Technology division for producing, editing, timing, organizing and running news broadcasts. The system is scalable and flexible enough to handle anything from the local news at a small-market station to large organizations spanning remote bureaus in multiple countries.

The basic organization of each news broadcast is called a "rundown" (US) or "running order" (UK). The run-down is a grid listing scripts, video, audio, character generator data, teleprompter control, director notations, camera operator cues, and timing estimates for each section of the broadcast.

ENPS integrates scripts, wire feeds, device control, and production information in a server/client environment. On the server side, ENPS runs an identical backup server (called a "buddy") at all times as a fail-safe. If the primary server fails, all users are redirected to the buddy server until such time as the primary comes back on-line. All document changes are queued on the buddy and copied back to the primary automatically when it returns to production. Note that this is not a mirror server as the changed data is copied to the buddy, but there is no direct replication inherent within the intercommunications between the servers, so if the data is corrupted due to hardware failure on one server, this corruption will not be replicated to the "buddy".

Device control can be managed either through a serial interface, or the MOS (Media Object Server) protocol. MOS functionality is included in the base ENPS license, but may be an extra add-on for the device that needs to interface with ENPS. MOS items such as video or audio clips can be added directly to scripts, and then used by third party software and devices during the broadcast. Many broadcast media systems support the MOS protocol to a greater or lesser degree by implementing any of the seven MOS Protocol 'profiles'. 

The ENPS client utilizes the .NET framework and other Windows-only technologies. The client, therefore, will only run in the Microsoft Windows operating system.

ENPS was originally developed by the Associated Press for use at the BBC in the United Kingdom as a replacement for the text mode system BASYS (which developed into Avid iNEWS), and the Corporation had the largest installation of the system with over 12,000 users in 300 different locations . It was announced in 2015 that the BBC were to cease using ENPS.

See also
 EidosMedia

References

External links 
 ENPS
 ENPS basics from Channel 4 (UK)

Business software
Broadcast journalism
Associated Press